Daniel Adam (born 30 November 1998) is a Moldovan footballer who plays as a midfielder for Moldovan club Spartanii Selemet.

References

1998 births
Living people
Moldovan footballers
Footballers from Chișinău
Association football midfielders
FC Zimbru Chișinău players
FC Codru Lozova players
Moldovan Super Liga players